Ancylolomia cervicella, the Bright grass-moth is a moth in the family Crambidae. It was described by Stanisław Błeszyński in 1970. It is found in India and Sri Lanka. It is externally similar to Ancylolomia felderella, having a reddish-brown but is distinguishable by its bright white stripe. It is similar to Ancylolomia argentata, but less red in shade, and has a black instead of silver streak on the lower forewing. It also varies in distribution, being found in India.

References

Ancylolomia
Moths described in 1970
Moths of Sri Lanka